Lin Liguo (December 23, 1945 – September 13, 1971) was the son of the Chinese Communist military leader Lin Biao and the person in charge of Project 571 Outline, a plotted coup against Mao Zedong.

Biography
 
Lin was born in 1945. He graduated from the elite Beijing No. 4 High School and later entered the Faculty of Physics at Peking University. He later became member of the Chinese Communist Party.

Following the start of Cultural Revolution, he dropped out of the university and joined the People's Liberation Army Air Force in 1967. Lin was promoted to the deputy director of the Office of the Air Force Command in 1969, by the commander of PLAAF Wu Faxian. This was an important position and all crucial documents must pass through the hands of Lin. 

According to Wu Faxian testimony in the 1980 trial:

"In fact, all the things the Air Force reported since July 6, 1970 were to Liguo. After all the things we had to deal with, was to listen to his orders."

Mao Zedong's government claims, that in 1970, under his father Lin Biao's direction, Lin Liguo made a plan known as Project 571  to assassinate Mao Zedong in Shanghai, but Mao was alerted to it and left Shanghai one day ahead of schedule and changed return route back to Beijing. In February 1971, Lin Liguo took Yu Xinye, the deputy director of the Political Department of the PLAAF to Hangzhou; then he called another deputy director Zhou Yuchi from Beijing to Shanghai, and met them in Shanghai from March 20th to 24th.

The Lin family, including Lin Biao, Ye Qun, and Lin Liguo, attempted to flee after the coup failed. On September 13, 1971, they fled in a PLAAF Hawker Siddeley Trident, from Qinhuangdao Shanhaiguan Airport.

Party documents later released state:
"the plane was making for the Soviet Union but was inadequately fueled for such a trip; it also had on board neither navigator nor radio operator. It crashed in Mongolia on September 13, 1971, burning to death all on board."

However, according to the historian J. D. Spence, "this story is essentially beyond verification, since the photographs later released by the Chinese authorities are of dubious authenticity and details on Lin Biao’s exact plans and on the other plotters are blurred" The government narrative also does not sufficiently explain how and why Lin Biao's plane crashed. Skeptics have claimed that Lin's decision to flee to the Soviet Union was illogical, on the grounds that the United States or Taiwan would have been safer destinations.

From November 1980 to January 1981, the trial of the members belonging to the "counter-revolutionary" group of Lin Biao and Gang of Four was held in Beijing. In particular, five high-ranking military personnel, including Wu Faxian, appeared before the court, where they testified that Lin Liguo was actively involved in Project 571. It is also still unclear whether Lin Biao himself planned a coup, or whether Lin Liguo and Ye Qun had such plans and did not inform Lin Biao about them.

Photo gallery

See also
Project 571

References

1945 births
1971 deaths
Beijing No. 4 High School alumni
Children of national leaders of China
Lin Biao family
People of the Cultural Revolution
People's Liberation Army personnel
Victims of aviation accidents or incidents in China
Victims of aviation accidents or incidents in Mongolia
Victims of aviation accidents or incidents in 1971
People from Harbin